A fold of peritoneum, the phrenicocolic ligament is continued from the left colic flexure to the thoracic diaphragm opposite the tenth and eleventh ribs; it passes below and serves to support the spleen, and therefore has received the name of sustentaculum lienis.

The phrenicocolic ligament is also called Hensing's ligament after Friedrich Wilhelm Hensing (1719–1745), a German professor for medicine in Giessen.

Clinical significance
Knowledge of basic anatomic and the variations of suspensory ligament of the spleen it is essential in the case of open surgery or laparoscopic splenectomy. Moreover, during some surgical procedures, in many cases it is necessary to exert a certain degree of traction on the spleen and on its peritoneal insertions. Unfortunately this traction may result in a rupture of the fibrous capsule of the organ, resulting in severe bleeding, very difficult to control. Particularly hazardous is the downward traction of the phrenicocolic ligament (this maneuver may be necessary for the mobilization of splenic flexure). This ligament marks the site where the colon exits the peritoneal cavity: the phrenicocolic ligament so is an important point of intersection of abdominal anatomy and, consequently, a crucial point for spread of abdominal disease.

References

External links
 
 

Abdomen